YBE may refer to:

 YBE, a "Young Black Entrepreneur"
 "Y.B.E.", a song on the 2000 hip-hop album H.N.I.C. by Prodigy of Mobb Deep
 ybe, the ISO code for the Western Yugur language in China
 YBE, the "Year's Basic Exemption" in the Canada Pension Plan
 The ICAO code for Stewart Aviation Services, United States

In places:

 YBE, the IATA airport code for Uranium City Airport in Canada